Cocoa Puffs is an American  brand of chocolate-flavored puffed grain breakfast cereal, manufactured by General Mills. Introduced in 1956, the cereal consists of small orbs of corn and rice flavored with cocoa. Cocoa Puffs have the same shape as Kix and Trix cereal.

Cocoa Puffs are sold in Canada, Latin America, and Europe under the Nesquik brand, via the Cereal Partners Worldwide agreement between Nestlé and General Mills.

Ingredients

On several occasions, Cocoa Puffs boxes, as well as commercials, stated that they are made with real Hershey's cocoa.

In December 2009, General Mills announced that it would cut the sugar in 10 kinds of cereal, including Cocoa Puffs, to less than 10 grams per serving. This could represent a 25% decline in the sugar content from the original level and 18% from the 2009 level of 11 grams per serving.

In 2020, General Mills, Inc. bought back the retro recipes for four of its ready-to-eat cereals: Cocoa Puffs, Golden Grahams, Cookie Crisp, and Trix. Some fans immediately noticed the change, calling the cereal smaller, denser, and with a less chocolatey flavor.

Flavors and variants

A cereal bar of Cocoa Puffs has been made. A layer of dried, sweetened condensed milk is added to the bottom, and marketed as a substitute for a bowl of milk and cereal.

A new addition was introduced in the summer of 2008, Cocoa Puffs Combos, which consists of the recognizable chocolate puffs with vanilla puffs. Unlike original Cocoa Puffs, the Combos cereal does not contain cocoa; instead, it contains artificial, imitation cocoa.

Besides Cocoa Puffs Combos, there have been varieties of the popular cereal. One such example was Cocoa Puffs Brownie Crunch in 2011. That cereal was described on the front of the box as "naturally and artificially flavored sweetened chocolate squares."

Advertising

The mascot of Cocoa Puffs, Sonny the Cuckoo Bird, was introduced in 1962. In television commercials, Sonny attempts to concentrate on a normal task but ends up coming across some reference to Cocoa Puffs themselves (usually described by the adjectives "munchy, crunchy, chocolatey") and bursts with enthusiasm, exclaiming his catchphrase "I'm cuckoo for Cocoa Puffs!" Sonny was voiced by Chuck McCann from 1962 to 1978, and has been voiced by Larry Kenney since 1978.

The line "cuckoo for Cocoa Puffs" has entered the vernacular as a term for somebody who is irrational.

Sonny's name comes from the original format of the commercials, in which he was paired with his grandfather (also voiced by McCann). Rather than proper names, they always referred to each other as "Gramps" and "Sonny." When the grandfather was dropped from the ads, "Sonny" remained as the character's name. In 2010, Gramps returned to the Cocoa Puffs ads, with McCann reprising his role as Gramps and Kenney continuing to voice Sonny.

Sonny was designed by Gene Cleaves. Animation pioneer "Grim" Natwick (of Fleischers' Betty Boop team) also contributed to the early images of Sonny and Gramps, according to then-contemporaries who collaborated with Natwick. 

Sonny was originally depicted as wearing a pink-and-white striped shirt, then in 1995 was redesigned, this time wearing 1990s "extreme" clothes and being given a more Disney-esque appearance. In 2004, he was redesigned in a more simplistic fashion, this time without clothing.

References

External links

Official website

Products introduced in 1956
General Mills cereals